Yahyaabad (also Romanized as Yaḩyáābād) is a village in Sahra Rural District, Anabad District, Bardaskan County, Razavi Khorasan Province, Iran. At the 2006 census, its population was 7, in 5 families.

References 

Populated places in Bardaskan County